Rocco D'Aiello (born 28 July 1986) is an Italian footballer who plays as a defender for Casarano.

Biography
D'Aiello started his career at Palermo. In mid-2005 D'Aiello left for Olbia with option to purchase half of the rights for €20,000. In July 2006 Palermo excised the buy-back option for €35,000 (made Olbia received €15,000 in net from Palermo) and re-sold to Gela in co-ownership deal along with Antonino Di Franco for a peppercorn fee of €500 each. In June 2007 Palermo gave up he remain 50% registration rights of D'Aiello and Di Franco to Gela for free.

After  seasons in Lega Pro divisions, in January 2010 D'Aiello left for Serie B club Torino in a temporary deal.

On 31 August 2010 he was signed by another Serie B club Triestina in another co-ownership deal. After the club relegated to Lega Pro Prima Division, he was signed by Serie B club AlbinoLeffe on 31 August 2011 in a loan deal. Triestina bankrupted in 2012.

D'Aiello then 3 seasons in 3 different Lega Pro clubs.

In summer 2015 he was signed by Gubbio. On 18 December 2015 he was signed by Foligno.

In summer 2016 he was signed by Bisceglie.

References

External links
 Football.it Profile 
 
 

Italian footballers
Serie B players
Serie C players
Palermo F.C. players
Olbia Calcio 1905 players
S.S.D. Città di Gela players
Torino F.C. players
U.S. Triestina Calcio 1918 players
U.C. AlbinoLeffe players
Association football defenders
Footballers from Palermo
1986 births
Living people